Waimānalo is a census-designated place (CDP) in the City & County of Honolulu, in the District of Koolaupoko on the island of Oahu, Hawaii, United States. This small windward community is located near the eastern end of the island. In the Hawaiian language Waimānalo means "potable water"; it is so named for the many brackish ponds in the area that were used for irrigation. As of the 2020 census, the CDP had a population of 6,057.

About 1000 meters east of Waimānalo is the neighborhood of Waimānalo Beach. Waimānalo has a small commercial center along Kalanianaole Highway, but is separated from the shoreline and Waimānalo Beach (the longest stretch of sandy shoreline on Oahu) by Bellows Air Force Station.  Waimānalo is noteworthy for its local flavor and large agricultural lots in the valley that extend back towards the Koolau from the center of town. Numerous plant nurseries are found in this area. There are no hotels in Waimānalo.

Waimānalo is the site of Sea Life Park, located near Hawaii Kai on Kalanianaole Highway. The U.S. postal code for Waimānalo is 96795.

Geography 
The nearest towns are Kailua to the west, and Waimānalo Beach to the east. Waimanalo Beach is located within the traditional Ahupuaa of Waimānalo.

Climate

Demographics 

As of the census of 2000, there were 3,664 people, 849 households, and 751 families in the CDP. The racial makeup of the CDP was 10.84% White, 0.16% Black or African American, 0.14% Native American, 26.80% Asian, 24.73% Pacific Islander, 0.33% from other races, and 37.01% from two or more races.  10.37% of the population were Hispanic or Latino of any race.

There were 849 households, 38.9% had children under the age of 18 living with them, 59.4% were married couples living together, 21.0% had a female householder with no husband present, and 11.5% were non-families. 8.5% of households were one person, and 3.3% were one person aged 65 or older.  The average household size was 4.31 and the average family size was 4.42.

In the community the population was spread out, with 31.4% under the age of 18, 10.7% from 18 to 24, 28.8% from 25 to 44, 20.7% from 45 to 64, and 8.4% 65 or older.  The median age was 30 years.  For every 100 females there were 97.2 males.  For every 100 females age 18 and over, there were 93.8 males.

The median household income was $47,594 and the median family income was $43,347. Males had a median income of $28,036 versus $21,621 for females. The per capita income for the CDP was $12,493.  8.1% of the population and 5.9% of families were below the poverty line.  Out of the total population, 9.6% of those under the age of 18 and 5.7% of those 65 and older were living below the poverty line.

Tourism 
Waimanalo is the home of Sea Life Park, a marine biology and sea-life attraction located near Makapu'u Beach. Japanese sumo grand champion, Chad Rowan (aka Akebono) was born in Waimanalo. A large statue of Akebono stands at the Waimanalo Shopping Center and serves as a tourist photo opportunity.

Notable natives and residents
 Sasha Colby, drag performer and contestant on Season 15 of Rupaul's Drag Race

References

External links

 Waimānalo ahupuaa - non-commercial community site

Census-designated places in Honolulu County, Hawaii
Populated coastal places in Hawaii